Baghuyeh (also Romanized as Bāghū’īyeh; also known as Baghoo, Bāghū, Bāghūyeh, and Bāgu) is a village in Sarduiyeh Rural District, Sarduiyeh District, Jiroft County, Kerman Province, Iran. As of the 2006 census, its population was 63, in 13 families.

References 

Populated places in Jiroft County